Salman Alkhazurovich Hashimikov, also spelled Hasimikov (born 4 May 1953), is a prominent Soviet retired heavyweight wrestler. A Chechen from Russia, he won two European and four World Championship gold medals in freestyle wrestling (1979, 1981, 1982, 1983). He had also won European and World gold as a Junior in 1970–71. After an unsuccessful business career, Salman spent five years as a professional wrestler in Japan at New Japan Pro-Wrestling (NJPW). There he won the IWGP Heavyweight Championship from Big Van Vader in May 1989.

Professional wrestling career

New Japan (1989–1990)
After a long career as an amateur wrestler Hashimikov and Victor Zangiev travelled to Japan training for a professional wrestling career in the NJPW Dojo, specifically by NJPW founder Antonio Inoki. Hashimikov made his debut against his friend Zangiev on February 22, 1989, in a five-minute exhibition match that ended in a draw between the two former amateur world champions, then he defeated Hiro Saito. On May 25 of that year Hashimikov defeated Big Van Vader to become the first European to hold the IWGP Heavyweight Championship. His reign was short lived as he lost the championship in his first defense only 48 days later, to Riki Choshu. Hashimikov was the first actual Russian-born to win a professional wrestling title in the capitalist countries before the Cold War ended, at the time most "Russians" in North America and Japan were in fact characters played by either Russian descendants or wrestlers with no Russian connection.

World Championship Wrestling (1990)
In December, 1990 Hashimikov and Zangriev travelled to the United States for their first, and only wrestling show, the 1990 Starrcade. At Starrcade they participated in the Pat O'Connor memorial tag team tournament. In the first round they defeated the team of Danny Johnson and Troy Montour representing Canada. In the second round the Russian team lost to NJPW representatives Mr. Saito and The Great Muta.

UWFI Japan (1993–1994)
Upon his return to Japan Hashimikov began working for UWF International in 1993 and 1994.

Legacy 
In 2018, in the village of Staraya Sunzha, Leninsky District of Grozny, Lenin Street was ceremoniously renamed after him.

Championships and accomplishments
New Japan Pro-Wrestling
IWGP Heavyweight Championship (1 time)

References

1953 births
Chechen martial artists
Chechen sportsmen
IWGP Heavyweight champions
Living people
Expatriate professional wrestlers in Japan
Russian male professional wrestlers
Russian male sport wrestlers
Russian people of Chechen descent
Soviet wrestlers
World Wrestling Championships medalists
European Wrestling Championships medalists